"Cypher" is a song by Cameroonian rapper Tenor. It was dropped on September 9, 2020, as his first release under Def Jam Africa Francophone. The song was produced by Eno On The Trck.

References 

Cameroonian songs